was a  after Kōka and before Ansei. This period spanned the years from February 1848 through November 1854.

Change of era
 February 28, 1848 : The era name of Kaei (meaning "eternal felicity") was created to mark the beginning of the reign of the Emperor  Kōmei.

The era name is derived from an aphorism in the Book of Song:  "A wise Emperor receives much help, One who esteems comfort is on the outside" .

Events of the Kaei Era
 July 1848  (Kaei 1): Ranald MacDonald, (b. 1824, Astoria, Oregon) left the whaler Plymouth in a small boat and landed on Rishiri Island. He was arrested and sent from Rishiri to Nagasaki where he was incarcerated; MacDonald began teaching English to 14 scholars, including Einosuke Moriyama, who later became an interpreter for the Japanese government when Matthew C. Perry entered Japan in 1854 (thus, in Japan, MacDonald is regarded as "The first native-speaking English teacher in Japanese history).
 1849 (Kaei 2): Medical practice of vaccination introduced by Dutch physician, Dr. Mohnike, at Dejima.
 July 1853 (Kaei 6): Commodore Matthew Perry, commanding the United States Navy's East Indies fleet, arrives in Japanese waters with four ships.
 1854 (Kaei 7): Commodore Perry returns to Edo Bay to force Japanese agreement to the Treaty of Kanagawa; and the chief Japanese negotiator was Daigaku-no kami Hayashi Akira (1800–1859), who was head of the Tokugawa bakufu's neo-Confucian academy in Edo, the Shōhei-kō (Yushima Seidō).
"Immediately, on signing and exchanging copies of the treaty, Commodore Perry presented the first commissioner, Prince Hayashi, with an American flag stating that this gift was the highest expression of national courtesy and friendship he could offer. The prince was deeply moved, and expressed his gratitude with evident feeling. The commodore next presented the other commissioners with gifts he had especially reserved for them. All business now having been concluded to the satisfaction of both delegations, the Japanese commissioners invited Perry and his officers to enjoy a feast and entertainment especially prepared for the celebration." -- from American eyewitness account of the event
 May 2, 1854 (Kaei 7, the 6th day of the 4th month): Fire broke out in the Sentō, and the conflagration spread to the Imperial palace. Both were destroyed. The emperor took refuge at Shimokam and afterwards went to Shōgon-in.
 November 4–7, 1854 (Kaei 7): Great Nankaidō earthquakes and tsunamis kill 80,000 people. An earthquake and tsunami struck Shimoda on the Izu peninsula; and because the port had just been designated as the prospective location for a U.S. consulate, some construed the natural disasters as demonstration of the displeasure of the kami.
 1854 (Kaei 7, 27th day of the 11th month): The era name was changed to Ansei (meaning "tranquil government"), which was meant to herald the beginning of a peaceful period. The impetus and explanation for this change of era names was said to have been the burning of the Palace in Kyoto in the preceding summer.

Gallery

Notes

References
 Cullen, Louis M. (2003). A History of Japan, 1582-1941: Internal and External Worlds. Cambridge: Cambridge University Press. ; ;  OCLC 50694793
 Hammer, Joshua. (2006). Yokohama Burning: The Deadly 1923 Earthquake and Fire that Helped Forge the Path to World War II.  New York: Simon & Schuster. ;  OCLC 67774380
 Hawks, Francis. (1856). Narrative of the Expedition of an American Squadron to the China Seas and Japan Performed in the Years 1852, 1853 and 1854 under the Command of Commodore M.C. Perry, United States Navy, Washington: A.O.P. Nicholson by order of Congress, 1856; originally published in Senate Executive Documents, No. 34 of 33rd Congress, 2nd Session.  OCLC 366454
 Nussbaum, Louis Frédéric and Käthe Roth. (2005). Japan Encyclopedia. Cambridge: Harvard University Press. ; OCLC 48943301
 Ponsonby-Fane, Richard A. B. (1956). Kyoto: The Old Capital of Japan, 794-1869. Kyoto: The Ponsonby Memorial Society.  OCLC 559477127
 Satow, Ernest Mason. (1905). Japan 1853-1864, Or, Genji Yume Monogatari. Tokyo: Naigwai Shuppan Kyokwai.  OCLC 643621953
 Sewall, John S. (1905). The Logbook of the Captain's Clerk: Adventures in the China Seas, Bangor, Maine: Chas H. Glass & Co. OCLC 296627697
 Whitney, Willis Norton. (1885). "Notes on the history of medical progress in Japan", Transactions of the Asiatic Society of Japan, [reprinted from Vol. 12, pp. 245–270.] Yokohama: R.J. Meiklejohn & Company....Link to digitized version of this lecture text

External links 

 National Diet Library, "The Japanese Calendar" -- historical overview plus illustrative images from library's collection
 National Archives of Japan ...Click link for map of Edo reproduced in the 6th year of Kaei (1853)

Japanese eras
1840s in Japan
1850s in Japan
1848 introductions
1840s establishments in Japan
19th-century disestablishments in Japan